Asosiasi Industri Rekaman Indonesia (ASIRI) (English: Recording Industry Association of Indonesia) is a trust that represents the recording industry interests in Indonesia.

It was established in 1978 and represents 84 member labels, which distribute around 95% of the music sold in Indonesia.

Certification levels 

ASIRI is responsible for certifying gold and platinum albums in Indonesia. The levels are:

 Domestic albums
 Gold: 15,000
 Platinum: 30,000

 International albums
 Gold: 5,000
 Platinum: 10,000

As of 2016, ASIRI certifies Gold and Platinum based on the nominal of money earned from the sale of albums and singles, both physically and digitally.
 Gold: Rp500 million ($37,300)
 Platinum: Rp1 billion ($74,600)

Repercussions of unauthorized recording 
Copyright infringement is not a new phenomenon in Indonesia. Before 1988, all recordings sold in Indonesia are unauthorized. But in the 1990s, the number was reduced to 20%, with retail value of unlicensed recordings in 1995, estimated at US$15 million. In the early 2000s, the infringement rate was increased back to a higher levels, which was at 55% in 2001, and 85% in 2003. Usually, infringement affects domestic artists in particular.

See also 

 Music industry
 List of music recording certifications

References

External links 
 

Music industry associations
Indonesian music industry
Music organizations based in Indonesia
Organizations established in 1978
IFPI members
1978 establishments in Indonesia